Melres e Medas is a civil parish in the municipality of Gondomar, Portugal. It was formed in 2013 by the merger of the former parishes Melres and Medas. The population in 2011 was 5,820, in an area of 27.81 km².

References

Freguesias of Gondomar, Portugal